Limmenius is a genus of tardigrades with one species, Limmenius porcellus.

References

External links 

 A specimen of Limmenius porcellus at the Museum of New Zealand

Apochela
Tardigrade genera
Monotypic protostome genera